Turtleback is the common name for plants in the genus Psathyrotes.

Turtleback may also refer to:

Places 
Turtleback Falls, North Carolina
Turtleback Mountain, New Hampshire
Turtle Back Zoo, New Jersey

Other 
Turtleback tomb, a type of tomb found in China, Japan, and Vietnam
A type of ship's deck that is curved to deflect water or shells – see turtleback deck